The Glen High School is a public English medium co-educational high school situated  in the suburb of Waterkloof Glen in Pretoria in the Gauteng province of South Africa. It's one of the top and most academic schools in Gauteng. The school has around 1,200 pupils.

Principals

G Batty - from January 1976 
R Brown
A Wilcocks
A Brink
C Nel

Scottish background

The Glen High School has a very Scottish background and the Heads of Clans have a kilt as part of their uniform. The President, Deputy-President, Treasurer and Secretary wear tartan ties.

Clans

The school is divided into four clans. Each clan has their own colour, song and motto. Each clan has two heads of clan, one male and one female. The clans each have a clan evening once a year where they perform a One Act Play and various skits. The clans also compete in sports such as athletics, swimming, basketball and tennis. The clans are:

Macdonald, Clan MacDonald           – Green
Stewart, Clan Stewart – Red
Gordon, Clan Gordon           – Yellow
Campbell, Clan Campbell         – Blue

Sport

Sport is not compulsory, as the school believes that the success and enjoyment is with voluntary participation. However, the grade 8 learners are expected to attend most of the sport meetings as spectators.

Sporting facilities include a 25-metre swimming pool, athletics grounds, several tennis and squash courts, a basketball court (indoor and outdoor), a rock-climbing wall and hockey fields.
 
The School offers the following sports:

Athletics
Basketball
Chess
Cricket
Cross country
Field hockey
Netball
Squash
Soccer
Swimming
Tennis

The Glen High School is part of the Pretoria English Medium High Schools Athletics Association (PEMHSAA) which is good spirited rivalry between all the Co-ed Government Schools in Pretoria. The Schools have three meetings held a year including the Swimming Gala (held at Hillcrest Swimming Pool), cross country (held at the host school), and an athletics meeting (held at Pilditch Stadium). Other schools participating in PEMHSAA are: 
Clapham High School
Hillview High School
Lyttelton Manor High School
Pretoria Technical High School
Pretoria Secondary School
 Rietondale High School
Sutherland High School, Centurion
Willowridge High School

Council of Pupils

The school has a student body run by Mrs. C. Steytler called the Council of Pupils (COP). An annual election is held in August for the following year's council members. The students are led by the president and a deputy president. There are a dozen student-led committees

Notable alumni

Past students of The Glen High School are called Glenwegians.
 
Marcos Ondruska – tennis player
Sharon Cormack – hockey player and member of South Africa's 1998 Women's Hockey World Cup squad
Anton Greyling –  Under-23 footballer
Ryan Hammond – dancer and contestant in Strictly Come Dancing 
Dennis Jensen – Australian politician
Keryn Jordan – football
Embeth Davidtz – Hollywood actress.
Candida Mosoma – musical theatre actress
Gabisile Tshabalala - Actress & TV presenter
Michael Mol – Mr South Africa 1996 – TV Personality
 Bernelee Daniell – Miss South Africa 1995
 Wayne Barker – Prominent South African artist
 Natasha Mazzone, Democratic Alliance Member of Parliament
 Zoocci Coke Dope, Record producer, Rapper, Singer, and Audio engineer.

The School song
The school song is The Glen Air:

Hark when the Glen is singing,
Hear, hear our voices ringing,
Loudly and proudly singing,
Praise of our school,
There's where we're taught our duty.
Pride in our country's beauty
Honour, sincerity,
Obedience to rule.

Striving for all the things,
Justice and mercy brings,
Long may our proud standards
loyally remain.
School of our high endeavour,
School of our youth together
School of our hearts forever
Honour its name

Hark when the Glen is singing,
Hear, hear our voices ringing,
Loudly and proudly singing,
Praise of our school,
There's where we're taught our duty.
Pride in our country's beauty
Honour, sincerity,
Obedience to rule.

Striving for all the things,
Justice and mercy brings,
Long may our proud standards
 loyally remain.
School of our high endeavour,
School of our youth together
School of our hearts forever
Honour THE GLEN

References

http://incwajana.com/wiki/Gabisile_Tshabalala

External links
The Glen High Schools official website

Schools in Pretoria
Educational institutions established in 1976
1976 establishments in South Africa